Russia competed as the host nation at the 2014 Winter Paralympics in Sochi, held between 7–16 March 2014.
Russia's 80 medals count is the highest medals ever recorded. The previous record was held by Austria with 70 medals in 1984.

In December 2014, German public broadcaster ARD aired a documentary which made wide-ranging allegations that Russia organized a state-run doping program which supplied their athletes with performance-enhancing drugs.  In November 2015, Russia's track and field team was provisionally suspended by the IAAF.

In May 2016, The New York Times published allegations by the former director of Russia's anti-doping laboratory, Grigory Rodchenkov, that a conspiracy of corrupt anti-doping officials, FSB intelligence agents, and compliant Russian athletes used banned substances to gain an unfair advantage during the Games.

On 9 December 2016, Canadian lawyer Richard McLaren published the second part of his independent report. The investigation found that from 2011 to 2015, more than 1,000 Russian competitors in various sports (including summer, winter, and Paralympic sports) benefited from the cover-up. Emails indicate that they included five blind powerlifters, who may have been given drugs without their knowledge, and a fifteen-year-old.

Alpine skiing

Men

Women

Snowboarding

Para-snowboarding is making its debut at the Winter Paralympics and it will be placed under the Alpine skiing program during the 2014 Games.

Men

Biathlon 

Men

Women

Cross-country skiing

Men

Women

Relay

Ice sledge hockey

Team roster
Head coach:  Sergey Samoylov     Assistant coaches:  Nikolay Sharshukov,  Andrey Ivanov

Summary

Preliminary round

Semifinal

Final

Wheelchair curling

Team

Standings

Results

Draw 1
Saturday, March 8, 9:30

Draw 2
Saturday, March 8, 15:30

Draw 3
Saturday, March 9, 9:30

Draw 5
Monday, March 10, 9:30

Draw 6
Monday, March 10, 15:30

Draw 7
Tuesday, March 11, 9:30

Draw 9
Wednesday, March 12, 9:30

Draw 10
Thursday, March 12, 15:30

Draw 12
Thursday, March 13, 15:30

Semifinal
Saturday, March 15, 9:30

Gold Medal Game
Saturday, March 15, 15:30

See also
Russia at the Paralympics
Russia at the 2014 Winter Olympics

References

Nations at the 2014 Winter Paralympics
2014
Winter Paralympics
Doping in Russia